Satu Mäkelä-Nummela (born October 26, 1970, in Orimattila, Finland) is a Finnish sports shooter. She won the gold medal in the Women's Trap event at the 2008 Summer Olympics. She has also won bronze medals in Women's Trap event in 1995 and 2009 at ISSF World Shotgun Championships. Her club is OSU (Orimattilan Seudun Urheiluampujat).

She has qualified to represent Finland at the 2020 Summer Olympics.

References

External links

Shooters at the 2008 Summer Olympics
Shooters at the 2012 Summer Olympics
Shooters at the 2016 Summer Olympics
Olympic gold medalists for Finland
Olympic shooters of Finland
Finnish female sport shooters
Living people
1970 births
People from Orimattila
Trap and double trap shooters
World record holders in shooting
Olympic medalists in shooting
Medalists at the 2008 Summer Olympics
Shooters at the 2015 European Games
European Games competitors for Finland
Shooters at the 2019 European Games
Shooters at the 2020 Summer Olympics
Sportspeople from Päijät-Häme